The dollar was a currency issued by Germany for use in its protectorate of Kiautschou, an area around the city of Tsingtau. The dollar was equal to the Chinese yuan and was divided into 100 cents. Banknotes were issued between 1907 and 1914, with coins issued in 1909. Banknotes denominated in tael were also issued in 1914.

See also 

 Deutsch-Asiatische Bank

References 

Modern obsolete currencies